"Barbra Streisand" is a song by Canadian-American DJ duo Duck Sauce. It was released on September 10, 2010. The song topped the charts in Austria, Belgium, Finland, the Netherlands, Norway, Scotland, and Switzerland and peaked within the top ten of the charts in Australia, Denmark, France, Germany, Israel, Italy, Ireland, Spain, Sweden, and the United Kingdom. On November 30, 2011, the song received a nomination at the 54th Grammy Awards for Best Dance Recording. It was also featured on Just Dance 3 for the Nintendo Wii and the Xbox Kinect.

Background and composition 
The song, named after the American singer and actress Barbra Streisand, extensively uses a sample replay of German disco group Boney M.'s 1979 international hit single "Gotta Go Home", which in turn borrows content from the 1973 German song "Hallo Bimmelbahn" by the band Nighttrain (the brothers Heinz and Jürgen Huth and Michael Holm; the hookline was written only by Heinz Huth). The sample replay of "Gotta Go Home" was produced by Mark Summers at SCORCCiO Sample Replays.

The single's album artwork is modelled directly after Streisand's own 1980 album, Guilty, which features a picture of her and Barry Gibb on the sleeve. For the "Barbra Streisand" cover, Streisand and Gibb's faces are digitally removed and replaced with duck beaks.

Music video
The music video is set in New York City (where Barbra Streisand was born) and it features many prominent and affiliated artists making cameo appearances, such as Kanye West, Pharrell Williams, André 3000, Ryan Leslie, Buckshot, Smif-n-Wessun, DJ Premier, Todd Terry, Chromeo, DJ Mehdi, So Me (who also directed the video), Diplo, Questlove, Ezra Koenig, Santigold, Yelawolf, The Roots and Fafi and The Fat Jew of Team Facelift. Barbra Streisand herself is not present in the music video, but it features her impersonator, Gayle Robbins.

Critical reception
Nick Levine of Digital Spy gave the song five out of five stars, stating, "... 'Barbra Streisand' actually kinda suits the track, a sassy, no-messin' disco-house dazzler which tips its trilby in the direction of Studio 54 circa 1979 – happily enough, just when Babs was enjoying her own dancefloor dalliance with 'The Main Event' / 'Fight' and 'No More Tears'. Lack of lyrics notwithstanding, it's deliriously catchy, endlessly danceable and ultimately so uplifting that it could even cheer you up after watching the denouement of The Way We Were."

Jason Lipshutz from Billboard gave the song a positive review, describing it as "one of the weirdest, most intoxicating dance anthems in recent memory," and wrote: "The most surprising thing about this collaboration ... is its richness in sound in between the beat-stopping utterances of Streisand's name. Guitar licks collide with heavy doses of synthesizers as a fist-pumping beat refuses to let up. The busy instrumentation is brilliantly paired with overly simple vocals: An upbeat chorus of 'oohs' instantly lodges inside the listener's brain, and 'Barbra Streisand' morphs into an inexplicable command to start dancing." Michael Cragg of The Guardian called the song "an insanely catchy slice of disco house."

Chart performance
The song peaked at number eighty-nine on the Billboard Hot 100 in May 2011, and number one on the Billboard Hot Dance Club Songs chart for the week ending on December 18, 2010.
 
In the United Kingdom, the song debuted and peaked at number three on the UK Singles Chart on October 17, 2010 ― for the week ending date October 23, 2010 ― selling 67,000 copies in its first week. It also topped the UK Dance Chart.

In the Netherlands, the song debuted at number twenty-five on the Dutch Top 40. It rose up to number two, staying there for several weeks. It broke the record for the most time spent in the second position, without ever reaching the first place.

Use in other media
 The song was featured in the Glee second-season episode titled "Born This Way".
 An official TV spot for the 2012 film The Guilt Trip includes a clip of Streisand and co-star Seth Rogen listening to the song in the car, with Streisand muting it when her name is uttered to instead shout "Me!"
 South Korean Hip-Hop boy band Phantom sampled the song in 2012's "Ice" (하이트광고음악). 
 The song was prominently used in Tourism Philippines's 2012 "It's More Fun in the Philippines" publicity campaign.
 The song was used in The Smurfs Dance Party (it was credited as Barbara Streisand) and later in Just Dance 3.

Track listing

 UK CD single
 "Barbra Streisand" (UK Radio Edit) – 2:20
 "Barbra Streisand" (Extended Mix) – 4:54
 "Barbra Streisand" (Afrojack Ducky Mix) – 5:09
 "Barbra Streisand" (Afrojack Meaty Mix) – 5:08

 UK digital download
 "Barbra Streisand" (UK Radio Edit) – 2:20
 "Barbra Streisand" (Original Mix) – 5:00
 "Barbra Streisand" (Afrojack Ducky Mix) – 5:09
 "Barbra Streisand" (Afrojack Meaty Mix) – 5:08
 "You're Nasty" (Vocal Mix) – 5:03

 German CD single
 "Barbra Streisand" (Radio Edit) – 3:14
 "Barbra Streisand" (Original Mix) – 4:54

 US digital download
 "Barbra Streisand" – 5:00

 Australian digital download
 "Barbra Streisand" (Radio Edit) – 3:14
 "Barbra Streisand" – 5:00

Dutch digital download
 "Barbra Streisand" (Radio Edit) − 2:43
 "Barbra Streisand" (UK Radio Edit) − 3:14
 "Barbra Streisand" (Original Mix) − 5:00
 "Barbra Streisand" (Afrojack Meaty Mix) − 5:07
 "Barbra Streisand" (Afrojack Ducky Mix) − 5:08

Charts

Weekly charts

Year-end charts

Certifications

Release history

See also 
 "Stars on 45" (song), with a similar vocal part

References

2010 singles
2010 songs
Duck Sauce songs
Novelty songs
Number-one singles in Austria
Number-one singles in Finland
Number-one singles in Norway
Number-one singles in Poland
Number-one singles in Scotland
Number-one singles in Switzerland
Ultratop 50 Singles (Wallonia) number-one singles
Ultratop 50 Singles (Flanders) number-one singles
Cultural depictions of Barbra Streisand
Songs written by Frank Farian
Songs written by Armand Van Helden
All Around the World Productions singles
Spinnin' Records singles